Blush was a Hong Kong-based Asian girl group originally composed of five members from the Philippines, India, China, Japan, and South Korea. They were formed by FarWest Entertainment in 2010 with the intent of popularizing an Asian vocal act in the United States as well as in all of Asia. They perform in the English language and the members currently reside in Los Angeles, California.  A reality show called Project Lotus: The Search for Blush about how the band was formed premiered on Channel V on March 8, 2012. They were the first Asian group to have its debut single hit the top 3 on a major US Billboard chart when "Undivided" featuring Snoop Dogg reached No. 3 on the Billboard Dance/Play Chart. Their second single, "Dance On", reached No. 1 on that chart.

History

Formation
Blush was formed by FarWest Entertainment in 2010 with the intent of popularizing an Asian vocal act in the United States and Asia as well as the rest of the world. They were formed through a selection process called Project Lotus, who were tasked with finding "Asia's Spice Girls". Five representatives from South Korea were selected as judges and trainees who traveled to different parts of Asia including China, Japan and India. One of the judges was rock singer Yoon Do-hyun of the South Korean rock band YB.

2010–2017
In 2011 they opened and performed alongside many artists including B.o.B, Far*East Movement, Black Eyed Peas, Justin Bieber, Jessie J, and Diana Ross.

Blush has released seven singles, the two most popular (according to YouTube views) being "Miss Out" (441,000 views) and "Undivided" (425,000 views) as of May 2013.

On May 24, 2013, at the Singapore Social awards, produced by Starcount, Blush performed alongside Carly Rae Jepsen, Cee Lo Green, and Psy. The concert was held at Gardens by the Bay in Singapore for four hours and was attended by 8,000 people. It was broadcast live on YouTube, peaking at around 12,000 people watching. They performed their singles "Warrior" and "All Stars" among others with mixed reception.

In 2015, Jihae left the group and was replaced by Nikita Vecino from the Philippines. The group went on to provide the theme song for Netflix animated series Glitter Force, which was Saban's English dub version of the anime Smile Pretty Cure. The song titled "HERE WE GO… (GO! GO!)" premiered along with the series on December 15. The group quietly disbanded sometime in 2017 after a long period of inactivity following their last performance in Hong Kong.

Discography

Blush has released two singles. They also recorded the song "Up, Up, and Away" for the second season of Disney's hit TV series Shake It Up. It was released as a single on February 14, 2012. It was also featured on the second soundtrack for the show, Shake It Up: Live 2 Dance released on March 20, 2012. On March 17, 2015, Blush released their debut album Make You Blush digitally. The album includes 17 original songs including all the songs from their Undivided EP and six remixes.

Extended plays 
 Blush's debut, The Undivided EP, was released on May 10, 2012. It features two of Blush's singles, "Undivided" (featuring Snoop Dogg) and "All Stars", as well as three new tracks, "Warrior", "Sweetly Leave Me" and "Together We're Greater".

Singles

As lead artist

Musical style
Tracks on their debut studio album are produced and written by award-winning songwriters and producers, including Tal Herzberg, JXL, Sander Kleinenberg, Jay Sean, Steve Schnur, and are mixed by Manny Marroquin.

Awards and nominations
 "Best Asian Artist" at 2011 Young Guns Music Awards (31 January 2012)

Tours
Blush toured with the Janoskians through the United States and Canada through October 31, 2014.

Asia
Blush has toured in the Philippines and Singapore as well as in Hong Kong. The group has also performed as the front act of Jessie J's concert tour in Malaysia (March 16, 2012), Indonesia (March 18, 2012) and Singapore (March 20, 2012).

United States
Blush has toured in California, Nevada, New Jersey and Illinois.

See also
List of number-one dance hits (United States)
List of artists who reached number one on the US Dance chart

References

Notes

Hong Kong girl groups
Musical groups established in 2010
Synthpop groups
Asian music groups
Musical groups disestablished in 2017
2010 establishments in Hong Kong
2017 disestablishments in Hong Kong